Onon (altitude 1,031 m, time zone UTC+8) is a town in the Khentii Province of Mongolia, situated at the upper Onon River.

Climate

References

Populated places in Mongolia